Lake Reed is a lake located in southern Winter Haven, Florida.

Features 
The lake's shore is marshland. It is bordered to the north and northeast by Eloise Loop Road, and on the west by pastures, and on the southeast and south by the gated Terranova residential community.

There is no public access to this lake, as it is fenced along Eloise Loop Road. 

The lake is inhabited by largemouth bass, bluegill and crappie.

References

Reed